Luise Gerbing (April 23, 1855 – February 25, 1927, in Waltershausen) was a German historian, specialising in the history of the Thuringian Forest, and the history of human migration and folklore in Thuringia.

References 

1855 births
1927 deaths
20th-century German historians
19th-century German historians